Jordan William Holsgrove (born 10 September 1999) is a Scottish professional footballer who plays as a central midfielder for Paços de Ferreira.

Club career

Reading
Born in Edinburgh while his father was representing Hibernian, Holsgrove returned to England a few months later, and was a Reading youth graduate. On 13 February 2017, he signed his first professional contract with the club. On 26 February 2019, after already becoming a regular with the club's under-23 squad, he agreed to a new deal until 2021.

On 27 August 2019, after spending the pre-season with the first team, Holsgrove was loaned to Spanish Segunda División B side CD Atlético Baleares on a season-long deal. He made his senior debut on 1 September, coming on as a second-half substitute for Marc Rovirola in a 1–0 home win against UD Las Palmas Atlético.

Holsgrove scored his first senior goal on 3 November 2019, netting ATBs third in a 3–1 home success over Real Oviedo Vetusta. He returned to the Royals in July 2020, despite Atlético Baleares attempting to extend his loan deal to cover for the play-offs, as the season was delayed due to the COVID-19 pandemic.

Celta
On 10 September 2020, Holsgrove signed a permanent two-year contract with La Liga side RC Celta de Vigo, being initially assigned to the reserves also in the third division. After impressing with the B-side, he made his first team debut on 5 January 2021; after replacing Lautaro De León in the 81st minute, he scored his side's second in a 2–5 Copa del Rey away loss against UD Ibiza.

Holsgrove made his debut in the Spanish top tier on 8 January 2021, replacing Miguel Baeza at half-time in a 0–4 home loss against Villarreal CF.

Paços de Ferreira
On 27 June 2022, Paços de Ferreira announced the signing of Holsgrove.

International career 
He was part of the Scotland under-20 team that won bronze medal at 2017 Toulon Tournament, the nations first ever medal at the competition.

Personal life
Holsgrove hails from a family of footballers. His father Paul was also a midfielder, while his uncle Lee and his grandfather John were both defenders.

Career statistics

Club

References

External links

1999 births
Living people
Footballers from Edinburgh
Scottish footballers
Association football midfielders
Reading F.C. players
La Liga players
Primera Federación players
Segunda División B players
CD Atlético Baleares footballers
Celta de Vigo B players
RC Celta de Vigo players
Scotland youth international footballers
Scottish expatriate footballers
Scottish expatriate sportspeople in Spain
Expatriate footballers in Spain
Anglo-Scots
Scottish expatriate sportspeople in Portugal